Shyampur Siddheswari Mahavidyalaya, established in 1964, is an undergraduate college in Shyampur I, West Bengal, India. It is affiliated with the University of Calcutta.

Departments

Science

Chemistry
Physics
Mathematics
Zoology
Computer Science

Arts and Commerce

Bengali
English
Geography
Sanskrit
History
Political Science
Philosophy
Education
Economics
Physical Education
Sociology
Food & Nutrition
Music
Commerce

Accreditation
Shyampur Siddheswari Mahavidyalaya is recognized by the University Grants Commission (UGC). , it was re-accredited and awarded B grade by the National Assessment and Accreditation Council (NAAC).

See also 
List of colleges affiliated to the University of Calcutta
Education in India
Education in West Bengal

References

External links
Shyampur Siddheswari Mahavidyalaya

Educational institutions established in 1964
University of Calcutta affiliates
Universities and colleges in Howrah district
1964 establishments in West Bengal